Calcium iodate is any of two inorganic compounds with the formula Ca(IO3)2(H2O)x, where x = 0 or 1. Both are colourless salts that occur as the minerals lautarite and bruggenite, respectively.  A third mineral form of calcium iodate is dietzeite, a salt containing chromate with the formula Ca2(IO3)2CrO4.  These minerals are the most common compounds containing iodate.

Production and uses
Lautarite, described as the most important mineral source of iodine, is mined in the Atacama Desert.  Processing of the ore entails reduction of its aqueous extracts with sodium bisulfite to give sodium iodide.  This comproportionation reaction is a major source of the sodium iodide.  

Calcium iodate can be produced by the anodic oxidation of calcium iodide or by passing chlorine into a hot solution of lime in which iodine has been dissolved. 

Calcium iodate is used as an iodine supplement in chicken feed. Ethylenediamine dihydroiodide (EDDI) is a more typical source of nutritional iodine.

References

Antiseptics
Calcium compounds
Iodates
Oxidizing agents